Shauna Anderson is a Native American and African-American restaurateur and author whose work has been accepted into the Smithsonian Anacostia Museum and Center for African American History.

Early life 

Anderson was born in Washington, D.C. to Geneva Anderson, a professional singer and piano player and Walter Christopher Holmes, a saxophone player. She was partially raised by her maternal grandmother who taught her how to clean pig intestines.

Career

Shauna Anderson worked as an Economic Statistician with the Internal Revenue Service for 15 years. In 1995 opened her restaurant, "The Chitlin Market" in Prince George’s County, Maryland. The following year, she launched a website. .

In 2003, the Smithsonian Institution's Anacostia Museum and Center for African American History and Culture accepted the papers of Shauna Anderson and her restaurant, The Chitlin Market, as part of its emerging collection of materials about African American celebrations, foods and foodways.

In 2006, Anderson sued the county for what she claims were deliberate, concerted efforts to shut down the Chitlin Market. Her legal case was dismissed. In the same year, The Chitlin Market and surrounding area were part of a story line in an episode of ABC’s drama “Commander in Chief” which drew rebuke from county officials due to the negative depiction of the neighborhood.  In 2007, the Prince Georges County, Maryland government shut down The Chitlin Market when the restaurant's location was rezoned from commercial to residential.

Books
 Anderson, Shauna; Place, Elizabeth, Offal Great-A Memoir from the Queen of Chitlins, Hyattsville, MD 2006.

References 

 Trescott, Jacqueline (April 23, 2003). "Guts Get Some Overdue Glory: Chitlin Merchant's Gift Feeds Museum's Plans."  The Washington Post.
 Lewis, Nicole. "Shauna Anderson is using real estate to create multiple streams of income". Black Enterprise Magazine.
 Randle, Leila. "Newsletter May 2003".  Soul Family Travels. Retrieved November 1, 2019.
 Nicholls, Walter. "Guts to Glory".  www.washingtonpost.com. The Washington Post. Retrieved October 22, 2019.
 Delaney, Arthur. "Queen of Chitlins wages war on PG County Council".  www.thehill.com. The Hill. Retrieved November 5, 2019.
  "Maryland Businesswoman Sues County". Global Wire. Retrieved October 22, 2019.
 Meyer, Eugene. "Cashing in on Chitlins".  www.washingtonpost.com. The Washington Post. Retrieved October 15, 2019.
 Merida, Kevin (May 5, 2002). ""Gut Instinct Chitlins online seemed like a good idea at the time. And it still does"". The Washington Post.

External links
Shauna Anderson website

American chefs
Living people
Place of birth missing (living people)
American women historians
1954 births
21st-century American historians
21st-century American women writers
Writers from Washington, D.C.